Making History is a play written by Irish playwright Brian Friel in 1988, premiered at the Guildhall, Derry on 20 September 1988. It focuses on the real-life plight of Aodh Mór Ó Néill, Earl of Tyrone, who led an Irish and Spanish alliance against the English in an attempt to drive them out of Ireland. The play is set before and after the Battle of Kinsale. The battle does not directly feature in the play, although it is central to the plot.

The  play's other main theme is O'Neill's unexpected third marriage  to the much younger, English-born  Mabel Bagenal, daughter and sister of  two of his most implacable enemies, which the play presents as a genuine though ill-fated love marriage.

Characters
Hugh O'Neill, the second Earl of Tyrone
Hugh O'Donnell, a younger Earl of Tyrconnel
Harry Hoveden, private secretary to O'Neill
Peter Lombard, Catholic Archbishop of Armagh
Mabel Bagenal, third wife of the O'Neill and daughter of Nicholas Bagenal
Mary Bagenal (later Mary Barnewall), her sister

References

1988 plays
Plays based on actual events
Plays by Brian Friel